Chesney Lee Hawkes (born 22 September 1971) is an English pop singer and occasional actor. He started his career at the age of 19 when he appeared in the film Buddy's Song, which featured his best-known single "The One and Only", which topped the UK Singles Chart for five weeks and reached the top 10 in the United States. Follow-up single "I'm a Man Not a Boy" peaked at 27 in the UK, with subsequent singles including "What's Wrong with This Picture?", "Stay Away Baby Jane" (a collaboration with Adam Schlesinger of Fountains of Wayne) and "Another Fine Mess" also charting in the top 100.

Aside from music, he appeared on Channel 4's The Games in 2005, winning a Bronze Medal. Hawkes appeared on the shows Hit Me Baby One More Time, Let's Dance for Comic Relief, and Sing If You Can. Hawkes also appeared in the musical Can't Smile Without You, as the role of Tony Lowiman.

Life and career 
Hawkes was born in Windsor, Berkshire. He was named after the singer and comedian Chesney Allen. His father is singer and bassist Len 'Chip' Hawkes of the 1960s band the Tremeloes. His mother is former actress/game-show hostess Carol Dilworth, who appeared in an episode of the 1960s version of Randall and Hopkirk (Deceased) called "For the Girl Who Has Everything", as well as the 1969 horror film The Haunted House of Horror. Keely Hawkes, his sister, was the lead singer of 1990s band Transister, and is currently a songwriter based in Los Angeles. He attended Charters School in Sunningdale. Jodie Hawkes, his brother, played drums in Chesney's band and is currently in The Tremeloes.

Hawkes's career began at 19, when he appeared as the title character in the film Buddy's Song. In March 1991, he released from the film's soundtrack his biggest single "The One and Only", on which his younger brother Jodie was the drummer. Written by Nik Kershaw, the song was later featured in the opening credits of Doc Hollywood (1991), starring Michael J. Fox; in the 2009 movie Moon, as the song Sam Rockwell wakes up to every morning; and again in the 2011 film Source Code (also directed by Moon director Duncan Jones) as the mobile phone ringtone of Michelle Monaghan's character. The single spent five weeks at No. 1 in the UK Singles Chart. He has released eight singles including "I'm a Man Not a Boy" and "Secrets of the Heart".

In 1993, his single "What's Wrong with This Picture?" reached number 63 in the UK, and his 2002 collaboration with Adam Schlesinger of Fountains of Wayne, "Stay Away Baby Jane", reached number 74 in the UK Singles Chart.

On 21 March 2001, Hawkes appeared on the second episode of ITV's documentary series Holiday Airport, which followed British holidaymakers as they passed through Palma Airport, Majorca. The episode resurfaced more than 20 years later on 13 March 2022, when it was uploaded to YouTube by ITV Studios' Our Stories channel.

Hawkes returned to the media's attention with his involvement in Channel 4's The Games in March 2005, in which he won a Bronze Medal. He also took part in the ITV programme Hit Me Baby One More Time in April that year. He released a single called "Another Fine Mess" in May 2005, it reached number 48. The following album of the same title featured fifteen songs written by Hawkes.

Hawkes was involved in a project called the Lexus Symphony Orchestra, a corporate promotion designed to showcase the quality of Lexus' in-car audio systems. Hawkes composed two original pieces of music performed by the London Symphony Orchestra for these events held at Castle Howard and Crystal Palace, in August 2007.

Hawkes appeared in a musical, Can't Smile Without You (featuring songs of Barry Manilow). In the show, Hawkes plays the part of Tony Lowiman who falls in love with a girl called Mandy when he visits New York.  Things take a turn for the worse when Tony is brutally attacked one night outside a club. The musical includes over 40 Barry Manilow songs. National tour started at the Liverpool Empire Theatre on 15 September 2008, prior to performances in the West End.

Hawkes appeared briefly in a cherry picker on Celebrity Big Brother (shown on 8 January 2009) on Channel 4. "The One and Only" was used as a cue to have contestants worship at a Chesney Hawkes shrine.

In January 2011, Hawkes performed at the live finale of Louie Spence's Showbusiness. During February and March 2011, he took part in the BBC series Let's Dance for Comic Relief. He now performs a mixture of his own material and covers at University Freshers week. In May that year, Hawkes took part in the ITV series Sing If You Can. In September, he appeared as Joseph in Joseph and the Amazing Technicolor Dreamcoat. On 24 December 2011, he appeared on the ITV programme Text Santa, with Ant & Dec.

Hawkes was due to take part on ITV's skating programme Dancing on Ice in 2012 but after fracturing his ankle, he had to pull out. He was replaced by Chico Slimani. In May, he played at Lakefest festival. In December, he appeared as an accident-prone version of himself in the ITV comedy drama Panto!.

In 2014, Hawkes performed "The One and Only" with a flashmob dance group in the streets of Manchester to promote MyMate Loans. In addition, he recorded a version of the song with different lyrics for a MyMate commercial.

In 2015, Hawkes competed in Celebrity MasterChef on BBC One. He was eliminated in the first of the semi-finals of the show.

On 25 March 2022, Hawkes released the box set The Complete Picture: The Albums 1991–2012, which consists of five CDs and one DVD. In addition, he released the digital single "The One and Only (2022 Nik Kershaw Remix)". In autumn 2022, he joined his father Chip and brother Jodie on the Sixties Gold Tour as part of the Tremeloes, becoming their singer for a series of dates around the UK. 

On 29 November 2022, Chesney rendered a half-time performance at the 2022 FIFA World Cup match between England and Wales.

Personal life 
Hawkes married wife Kristina (who is American) on 4 July 1997. They lived in Chertsey, Surrey with their three children before moving to Los Angeles.

Entrepreneur Duncan Bannatyne is a fan, and Hawkes performed as a surprise at his 60th birthday party in 2009.

Hawkes is an honorary member of the JCR of St Hugh's College, Oxford.

Hawkes is a supporter of West Ham United F.C.

Discography

Albums

Studio albums

Extended plays

Compilation albums

Box sets

Singles

Filmography 
The Bill – "Photo Finish" (1991)
Buddy's Song (1991)
Prince Valiant (1997)
Panto! (2012)
Hollyoaks (2022)

References

External links 

 

 

1971 births
Living people
English male singers
English songwriters
English male actors
20th-century English singers
20th-century British male singers
21st-century English singers
21st-century British male singers
British male songwriters
People from Windsor, Berkshire
Musicians from Berkshire